Thomas Francis Bayard Jr. (June 4, 1868 – July 12, 1942) was an American lawyer and politician from Wilmington, Delaware. He was a Democratic U.S. Senator from Delaware in the 1920s.

Early life

Bayard was born in Wilmington, Delaware, son of U.S. Senator Thomas F. Bayard Sr. and grandson of U.S. Senator James A. Bayard Jr.

Bayard graduated from Yale University in 1890, where he was a member of Skull and Bones, and served as secretary of his class. He attended Yale Law School and was admitted to the Delaware Bar in 1893.

Personal life
He married Elizabeth Bradford du Pont on October 3, 1908. Together, they had five children:
 Alexis I. du Pont Bayard (Feb. 10, 1918 in Wilmington, Delaware - Sep. 2, 1985 in Philadelphia, Pennsylvania) Graduate of Yale University, Politician and 13th Lieutenant Governor of Delaware. Married to Jane Buckley Hildreth (Nov. 14, 1916 in Philadelphia, Pennsylvania - Dec. 12, 2008 in Palm Beach, Florida) in 1944. He died following heart surgery.
 Elizabeth
 Ellen
 James
 Thomas Francis Bayard III (Oct. 12, 1902 in Greenville, Delaware - Dec. 17, 1983 in Middleburg, Virginia) Graduate of the University of Pennsylvania, Executive at the DuPont Company. Married to Ruth Broadbent Castor (Mar. 27, 1906 - Jun. 21, 1994) in 1928 in Paris, divorced in 1944.

Career
After living in New York City for four years and working as assistant corporation counsel, he returned to his Delaware law practice in 1901. He served as a chairman of the Delaware Democratic Party's state committee from 1906 to 1916, and as solicitor for the city of Wilmington from 1917 until 1919.

Bayard was elected to the U.S. Senate in a special election on November 7, 1922, to fill the vacancy caused by the resignation of U.S. Senator Josiah O. Wolcott. On the same day, he was also elected for the full term to follow, in both instances defeating incumbent Republican U.S. Senator T. Coleman du Pont (a cousin of Bayard's wife), who had been appointed. During this term, he served in the Democratic minority in the last session of the 67th Congress, and in the 68th, 69th, and 70th Congress.

Bayard lost his bid for a second full term in 1928 to Republican John G. Townsend Jr., the former governor. He then lost another bid for a second full term in 1930 to incumbent Republican U.S. Senator Daniel O. Hastings. In all, Bayard served one term and part of another, from November 7, 1922, to March 3, 1929, during the administrations of U.S. presidents Warren G. Harding and Calvin Coolidge. Subsequently, he resumed his law practice in Wilmington.

Death and legacy
Bayard died at Wilmington and is buried there in the Old Swedes Episcopal Church Cemetery. His son, Alexis I. du Pont Bayard, served as Lieutenant Governor of Delaware from 1949 to 1953.

He is the namesake of the town of Bayard, West Virginia.

References

References

External links

 Biographical Directory of the U.S. Congress
Delaware’s Members of Congress

The Political Graveyard 

 

 

1868 births
1942 deaths
Du Pont family
Thomas F. Jr.
American Episcopalians
People from Wilmington, Delaware
Yale Law School alumni
Delaware lawyers
Delaware Democrats
Democratic Party United States senators from Delaware
Burials in New Castle County, Delaware